Rental relocations are specific to certain types of rental equipment such as portable buildings, construction trailers, large generators and heavy equipment.

A rental relocation is normally required because the customer or end user of the equipment wants to move the rented item from one construction job site to another, or simply reposition on the existing site (particularly in the case of construction trailers, portable storage etc.). The key to why a relocation is necessary is that the customer does not have the resource or equipment available to move the asset.

Taxation and management
Within the United States market, different states, cities and counties may charge rental taxation based on delivery or shipping location, or based on the rental companies shipping address.

For locations such as the UAE (Abu Dhabi, Dubai etc.) there are no taxation requirements as taxes are not raised for rental services.

Rental management software can assist in managing rental relocations both in terms of creating shipping documentation and in terms of managing the taxation and address changes.

See also
Relocation (personal)

References

Moving and relocation